Yanwukou Township is an rural township in Sangzhi County, Zhangjiajie, Hunan Province, China.

Administrative division
The township is divided into 9 villages, the following areas: Banzhu Village, Yanwukou Village, Shaheping Village, Lujiata Village, Longjiaping Village, Daweiba Village, Sabuxi Village, Sijiatian Village, and Wujiatian Village (班竹村、岩屋口村、沙河坪村、陆家塔村、龙家坪村、大尾坝村、撒埠溪村、四家田村、五家田村).

References

External links

Former towns and townships of Sangzhi County